Matt Raich is an American football coach currently with the Indianapolis Colts serving as assistant defensive line coach. A 26-year coaching veteran, he has 18 seasons of NFL experience. Raich is a native of Monaca, Pa.

Coaching career 
College Coaching (1993-94; 1996-2002; 2013)

Collegiately, Raich coached at Duquesne (2013), Robert Morris (1996-98, 2000-02), Glenville State (1999) and his alma mater, Westminster (Pa.) College (1993-94).

German Federal League (1999)

He coached in the German Federal League in 1999 and served as the defensive coordinator for the Hildesheim Invaders.

NFL Coaching (2002-2012; 2014-18)

Prior to Indianapolis, he coached in the NFL with the Cincinnati Bengals (2018), Detroit Lions (2014-17), Arizona Cardinals (2007-2012) and Pittsburgh Steelers (2002-06). He won Super Bowl XL with the Steelers at the conclusion of the 2005 season.

Raich started his NFL career as a player personnel intern for Pittsburgh from 2002 to 2003.

St. Louis BattleHawks (2020)

In 2020, Raich served as the co-defensive coordinator/linebackers coach for the St. Louis BattleHawks of the XFL

Indianapolis Colts (2020-current)

In 2021, the Colts finished in the top-five in takeaways (33, second), fumble recoveries (14, tied-first) and interceptions (19, tied-third). Defensive tackle DeForest Buckner earned his second career Pro Bowl selection.

In 2020, the Colts defense ranked in the top-10 in various categories, including total defense (332.1 yards per game, eighth), rush defense (90.5 yards per game, second), takeaways (25, tied-fifth) and points per game allowed (22.6, tied-10th). For the first time since 1971, the Colts ranked in the top-five in run defense. For the first time since 2007, Indianapolis finished in the top-10 in total defense.

Buckner also earned Associated Press First Team All-Pro honors in 2020 as he registered a single-season franchise record for most sacks (9.5) by a defensive tackle. Buckner joined Art Donovan (1954-57) and Gene Lipscomb (1958-59) as the only Colts defensive tackles to earn that honor.

Playing career 
Raich played linebacker at Westminster (Pa.) College from 1989 to 1994 and finished as the school's leading tackler. He earned three NAIA All-America Awards and was part of Westminster teams that won 42 of 48 games, including the NAIA National Championship in 1989.

References 

Indianapolis Colts coaches

Year of birth missing (living people)
Living people